Raihorodok is an urban-type settlement in Kramatorsk Raion (district) in Donetsk Oblast of eastern Ukraine, which is located near the river Kazennyi Torets and Donets. Population:  

Until 18 July 2020, Raihorodok was located in Sloviansk Raion. The raion was abolished on that day as part of the administrative reform of Ukraine, which reduced the number of raions of Donetsk Oblast to eight, of which only five were controlled by the government. The area of Sloviansk Raion was merged into Kramatorsk Raion.

During the 2022 Russian invasion of Ukraine, Russian occupiers blew up a nearby dam causing flooding in Raihorodok before the settlement was liberated by the Ukrainian army.

References

Urban-type settlements in Kramatorsk Raion